An expansion pack is an addition to an existing game.

Expansion pack or Expansion Pak may refer to:
 Expansion Pak, a Nintendo 64 accessory that enhances many of the system's games, and is required for a few games
 Memory Expansion Pak, a Nintendo DS accessory that adds 8 MB of system memory, and is required for the web browser
 Expansion Pack, a Nintendo Switch Online add-on with downloadable games, including Nintendo 64 and Sega Genesis games